This is a list of teahouses. A teahouse is an establishment which primarily serves tea and other light refreshments. Sometimes the meal is also called "tea". Although its function varies widely depending on the culture, teahouses often serve as centers of social interaction, like coffeehouses.  Some cultures have a variety of distinct tea-centered houses of different types that all qualify under the English language term "teahouse" or "tearoom". For example, the British or American tearoom serves afternoon tea with a variety of small cakes.

Europe
 Blauwe Theehuis, Amsterdam
 Délifrance, French bakery chain
 Dobrá čajovna, Czech-based international chain
 TeaGschwendner, Germany-based international chain of retail shops and bistros

Britain

 ABC tea shops, now defunct
 Bettys and Taylors of Harrogate, chain in Yorkshire
 Jacksons of Piccadilly, tea merchant
Kardomah,  a chain of tea and coffee shops  in England, Wales, and a few in Paris, popular from the early 1900s until the 1960s, but now almost defunct.
 Lyons Corner House, now defunct; its waitresses were known as Nippy, because of their speed
 The Orchard, Grantchester, just outside Cambridge
 a modern village tea room, adjoining Rivington Unitarian Chapel
 Tchai-Ovna, Glasgow music venue
 Willow Tearooms, Glasgow, founded 1903

Britain abroad
 Babington's tea room
 English Tea House and Restaurant, Malaysia

The Americas

Canada
 Lake Agnes Tea House, Alberta
 Plain of Six Glaciers Tea House, Lake Louise, Alberta

United States

 Argo Tea, Chicago chain
 Dushanbe Tea House
 Lollicup Coffee & Tea, chain specialising in bubble tea
 Salvation Army Waiʻoli Tea Room, Hawai'i
 Tavalon Tea, New York tea merchant
 Tealuxe, a chain

Asia

India
 Brooke Bond Taj Mahal Tea House, Mumbai, India
 Chai Point, Bengaluru & New Delhi, India

China
 Cha chaan teng, common tea restaurants in Greater China
 Fuchun Teahouse, China
 Luk Yu, established in 1933 in Hong Kong
 Ten Fu Group, company

Japan

 Chashitsu, architectural spaces designed to be used for the Japanese tea ceremony
 Jo-an
 Tai-an
 Kakurin-tei
 Meimei-an
Glass Tea House - KOU-AN, teahouse designed by Tokujin Yoshioka

Taiwan

 Chatime, Taiwan-based international chain
 EasyWay, Taiwan-based international chain
 Shiatzy Chen, Taiwanese fashion house
 Quickly, Taiwan-based global chain 
 Wistaria Tea House
 Ten Ren Tea

Others
 Pak Tea House, Pakistan

See also

 Catherine Cranston
 List of bakery cafés
 Thomas Ridgway
 Types of restaurant

References

External links
 

 
Tea houses